Craigton can refer to:

Craigton, Angus, a village in Angus, Scotland
Craigton, East Dunbartonshire, an area of Milngavie, Scotland
Craigton, Glasgow, a suburb of Glasgow, Scotland
Craigton (ward), an electoral ward of the Glasgow City Council
Craigton, Highland, a village in Highland, Scotland
Craigton, Stirling, a hamlet in Stirling, Scotland